Lacrosse was a demonstration sport at the 1932 Summer Olympics in Los Angeles.  Teams from Canada and the United States played three games, with the team from the United States winning the series 2 games to 1. Games were played in the new Los Angeles Memorial Coliseum in front of large crowds.

Canada was represented by an all-star team, while the United States was represented by the Johns Hopkins lacrosse team, coached by Ray Van Orman.

The first game on Sunday, August 7 was played on the same day as the marathon, which finished in the Coliseum. The United States won 5-3 in front of 75,000 people. Canada won the second game 5-4 with a last second goal. The deciding game was won by the United States 7-4.

Results

Teams

Canada

Henry Baker
Joseph Bergin
Richard Buckingham
Kenneth Calbeck
W. Fraser
J. Frasir
Norman Gair
Stuart Gifford
William Harrison
F. A. Hawkins
Rowland Mercer
Bernard McEvoy
John McQuarrie
Yvan Paquin
Anthony Pelletier
Matthew Rohmer
Norman Russell
Bryce Spring
H. D. Wallace
J. A. Worthy

United States

Francis Beeler
Walter Kneip, Jr.
Douglas Stone
Joseph Darrell
Millard Lang
Fritz Stude
Lorne Guild
Marshall McDorman
James W. Ives
James Merriken
Caleb Kelly
George Packard
Donaldson Kelly
Peter W. Reynolds
William Triplett
Jack Turnbull
Church Yearley
William Weitzel

Source:

See also
Federation of International Lacrosse
World Lacrosse Championship

References

1932
1932 Summer Olympics events
1932
1932 in lacrosse
Men's events at the 1932 Summer Olympics